White House Heritage High School is a public high school located in White House, Tennessee. The school is operated by the Robertson County school district, and has 1,006 Students from grades 7–12.

Construction began on the school's present-day campus on July 7, 2008, it opened in August 2010. In February 2015, sixteen students were suspended after a tip led to the discovery that adderall was being used by the students. In December 2016, a teacher, Dan Deforest, was put on unpaid suspension because he "sent an inappropriate picture  to a 14/15-year-old female student on Snapchat." Deforest resigned from his position on December 14, 2016. In June 2018, it was announced that Stetson Dickerson would become the school's football coach, replacing Hunter Hicks. On December 3, 2018, security was increased at White House Heritage, following a threat against the school. The threat was later determined to be from a student sent via text through an anonymous app.

On August 12, 2019, Carl Miller, who was a girls' basketball coach nearby at Greenbrier High School, became the boys' basketball coach at White House Heritage. Miller replaced Mike Petrone, who had been the team's coach from 2003 until his retirement in July.

Athletics
The White House Heritage Patriots Compete in the following sports:

Baseball
Basketball 
Bowling
Boxing
Cross country
Football
Golf
Soccer
Softball
Volleyball

References

External links

Public high schools in Tennessee
Public middle schools in Tennessee
Schools in Robertson County, Tennessee